Donovan Cech (born 2 May 1974) is a South African rower. He competes in the Coxless Pairs division and his boat partner for the past few years has been Ramon di Clemente.  The pair won a Bronze medal at the 2004 Summer Olympics in Athens.

References

1974 births
Olympic rowers of South Africa
Rowers at the 2000 Summer Olympics
Rowers at the 2004 Summer Olympics
Living people
Olympic bronze medalists for South Africa
South African male rowers
Olympic medalists in rowing
Alumni of Maritzburg College
Medalists at the 2004 Summer Olympics
World Rowing Championships medalists for South Africa